The Toyota Previa, also known as the  in Japan, and Toyota Tarago in Australia, is a minivan that was produced by Toyota from 1990 until October 2019 across three generations.

The name "Previa" is derived from the Spanish and Italian for "preview", as Toyota saw the first Previa as a vehicle that would preview technologies used in future minivans. The Previa was the second largest minivan in Toyota's lineup in Japan after the bigger and more luxurious Alphard/Vellfire.



First generation (XR10/XR20; 1990) 

The first generation, designed by Toyota designer Tokuo Fukuichi and Calty designer David Doyle in 1987 (patent filed 24 December 1987), was introduced on 27 January 1990, and had only one sliding side door for the rear passengers. It featured a mid-engined platform, where the inline-four cylinder gasoline-powered engine was installed almost flat (at a 75-degree angle), beneath the front seats.

Installing the engine in this configuration allowed moderately easy access to the spark plugs, which were located underneath a panel on the upper left-side of the vehicle, after removing the front passenger seat, the carpet and an access panel.

All engine-driven accessories, such as the alternator, power steering pump, air conditioning compressor and radiator fan, are accessible from the front hood, driven off the front of the engine by an accessory driveshaft, and is known as the Supplemental Accessory Drive System, or "SADS". This allows even front/rear weight distribution, which benefits ride quality and handling. However, it also prevents the installation of a larger engine, while the cost could not be relayed by sharing the platform with other vehicles.

In Japan, two smaller versions, the Toyota Estima Lucida and Toyota Estima Emina, were produced from January 1992, which were approximately  narrower and  shorter than the standard model, which continued to be sold in Japan, but as the "wide-body" Estima.

The reason for the difference between the smaller Emina and Lucida models is the vehicle tax system in Japan, which is based on the product of length and width of the car, and the smaller variants fall into a lower tax band.  The Estima Emina and Estima Lucida were also available with a 2.2-liter diesel engine (3C-T and 3C-TE). In Japan, the Estima and Estima Emina were exclusive to the dealerships called Toyota Store. The Estima Lucida sold at Toyota Corolla Store dealerships. The two received small redesigns in 1994 and a facelift in 1996.

The first generation Previa was available in both rear- and all-wheel drive versions (called All-Trac) and powered by a  JIS four-cylinder 2.4-liter fuel injection engine. Available with a four-speed automatic or five-speed manual gearbox, this Previa also seated seven or eight people, with three seating configurations offered (North America only received the seven passenger configurations, however).

All configurations have a driver and front passenger seat forward, and a three-seat bench seat at the rear that splits and folds flat against the sides of the cabin. The eight-seat configuration contains a 2/1 split swiveling bench seat in the middle row, while the seven-seat configurations contain either two independently swiveling captain's chairs (referred to as "Quad Seating"), in the middle row or a two-seat bench offset towards the driver's side.

The third row is also better upholstered in the seven-seat version. It was available with either four-wheel disc brakes or traditional front disc/rear drum brake setup, with anti-lock brakes (ABS) as an option.

Estima Emina

Estima Lucida

United States 

In the United States, the Previa was sold from March 1990 (for the 1991 model year) until 1997. It was imported from Japan to compete with Chrysler Corporation's successful Dodge Caravan minivan, and its twins, the Chrysler Town and Country and Plymouth Voyager. Chrysler CEO Lee Iacocca accused Toyota of dumping the Previa in the United States in order to take market share in the minivan segment from Chrysler. However, his claims were never substantiated.

While the Previa proved more popular than the Toyota Van it replaced, it did not acquire significant market share from Chrysler—due to its higher price, controversial styling (for its time), lower fuel economy and engine performance—and also due to Chrysler launching redesigned minivans around the same time.

The mid-engine design proved to have a significant limitation—the inability to incorporate larger engine sizes, which proved a problem as American drivers were used to having more power; the Dodge/Plymouth/Chrysler models were sold with available V6 engines with slightly more power. At the same time, this layout granted the Previa greater interior space than the Chrysler competitors.

Initially, the S/C engine was only available as an option on the LE for the 1994 model year and all models for 1995.

The United States version of the Previa was discontinued after the 1997 model year, replaced by the more traditionally designed, front-wheel drive, US-designed and built, Camry-based Sienna.

The Insurance Institute for Highway Safety gave the Toyota Previa a "Poor" rating.

United Kingdom 

The first UK market Previas were sold in September 1990, with one trim level called GL, followed by GX and GS in later years. No diesel engine Previas were made for the UK market.

Netherlands 
The first generation Previa was marketed in the Netherlands between 1991 and 1994. In 1994, the supercharged or SC model was made standard on all Previas. The only engine available was a 2.4-liter 4-cylinder engine until 1995. Trim levels were base (later renamed to i denoting an injection engine), GL, GLi and GXi. The 2.2-liter diesel version was a popular grey import.

Australia 
In Australia, the Tarago was offered in GL/GLi, GLS and GLX forms with 7–8 passenger seating from launch in September 1990. In addition to the Australian market, there were various special edition models available, which varied in trim levels. These include the RV (either 5-speed manual or 4-speed automatic with 4WD), commemorative Rugby World Cup editions and Getaway. Feature-wise, all of the special edition models are marketed between the base GLi and GLX models. When the later-style update models were released in Australia, the top-of-the-line GLS model was renamed "Ultima" and the Getaway became a mainstay trim level, being renamed Getaway II.

Additional notes 

 The five-speed manual Previas (North American models) were made from 1990 through to 1993 (model year 1991 to 1993); none of these have a supercharger.
 Starting in 1991 for model year 1992, Previas (North American models) came with a driver's side airbag and third brake-light with dual airbags becoming standard in September 1993 for model year 1994, being the first minivan to offer a passenger airbag as standard.
 From 1991 to 1997 (from 1992 to 1997 model years), North American Previas also came with a swivel feature on the optional middle-row captain's chairs; 1990 to 1991 production (1991 model year) had fixed optional captain's chairs.
 Available on Previas outside the U.S., was an ice-maker/refrigerator that doubled as a beverage heater called the Hot/Cool Box.
 The supercharged engine is different from the normally aspirated engine, owing to a slight decrease in compression ratio and stronger engine internals. The supercharger is engaged on-demand by an electromagnetic clutch, based on input from the engine management system computer (the Engine Control Unit, or ECU).
 Previas have optional dual moonroofs: A power horizontal-sliding only glass moonroof above the middle row of passengers, and a pop-up glass moonroof above the front seats.
 Previas were also the first van to pass all US safety standards as pertaining to front impact, driver airbag, passenger airbag, center-mounted brake light, ABS, daylights, etc.
 Fuel efficiency is below average (11–13 L/100 km or 18.1–21.4 mpg city, 10–11 L/100 km or 21.4–23.5 mpg highway); the small four-cylinder engine needs to work a bit harder owing to the power to weight ratio of the vehicle, compared with today's 6-cylinder engines. The addition of the supercharger slightly improves power and gives better fuel consumption.
 The Previa gives a practically panoramic view, excluding the pillars behind the front doors. This also turns the van into a greenhouse, accumulating extreme heat in a short period of time, although solar control glass later became an option, to help alleviate the problem.
 Previas are affectionately called "eggvans", "eggs" or "beans", because of their shape. In Australia, they have been referred to as "Wombats", because they somewhat resemble the marsupial of the same name. In New Zealand, they are very popular with freedom campers and are referred to as "Bucky" buses.
 In the United States, the first generation Previa model variations, in order of lowest to highest price/option features, are: DX, DX All-Trac, DX S/C, LE, LE All-Trac, LE S/C, LE S/C All-Trac (where S/C = Supercharged and AllTrac = 4WD)
 The front passenger seat and a section of floor pan must be removed to perform a tune up because there is not enough room to remove spark plug leads or spark plugs.
 When the Insurance Institute for Highway Safety tested the 1996 model in the offset frontal crash test, it revealed many safety problems: the cabin structure was unstable, the steering wheel moved upward all the way to the windshield, the lap belt tore which allowed the dummy to end up in a partially reclining position, and there were high forces on both of the lower legs, in which the IIHS evaluated it "Poor".
 In some countries (mainly Australia, Japan and the United Kingdom), unsold Estimas and Lucidas were re-badged as 1995/1996 Previas.

Second generation (XR30/XR40; 2000) 

The first generation Previa was sold outside the United States until 8 January 2000, when a newer front-wheel drive second generation replaced it. The second generation was not available in North America, as they received the Toyota Sienna. The second generation Previa had a slightly longer wheelbase (2900 mm) and was both narrower (1790 mm) and lower (1770 mm) than the first one; it switched to FF layout and was based on the Camry platform.

It was produced with sliding rear passenger doors on both sides and offered space for up to six, seven or eight passengers and, as with the first generation, was sold as the Estima in Japan and as the Tarago in Australia. The range available in Australia was the GLi, GLX and Ultima.

Models sold on the European markets were available with both gasoline and diesel-powered four-cylinder engines. Both models featured a five-speed manual transmission as the part of standard equipment, while a four-speed automatic was available as an option on gasoline-powered model.

Australian models (known locally as ACR30R) were only available with the 2.4-liter petrol engine and a four-speed automatic.

In Japan, a 3.0-liter V6 engine and a 2.4-liter hybrid version of the Estima were available.

Estima Hybrid 
The Estima Hybrid employed the Toyota Hybrid Synergy Drive and used two electric motors. A 2.4-liter gasoline engine and a  electric motor power the front wheels, while the rear wheels are propelled by a  electric motor. The vehicle had been on sale in Japan since June 2001. Production of the hybrid started in May 2001 at the Motomachi plant and June 2002 at the Fujimatsu plant. It is claimed by Toyota to be the world's first hybrid minivan.

Third generation (XR50; 2006) 

The third-generation model was introduced in 2006 in Japanese and Australian markets as the Estima and Tarago respectively, and as the Previa in other markets. This generation was notably absent from the European market.

Features include an available second generation Hybrid Synergy Drive drivetrain (only in the Japanese market), automatic parallel and reverse parking (only on Toyota Estima), Lane-Keep Assist (LKA) system which detects the lane markers on the road and steers the car on the right direction (for Estima only), Adaptive Front-Lighting System low beam headlamps which assists to light up the upcoming road around a bend, track-mounted second row reclining seats with footrests, and power-folding split third row seats (for seven-seater models). It received a minor facelift in 2009. G-BOOK was added to the list of optional features. Active driver assist features such as Lane Keeping Assist and Dynamic Radar Cruise Control were offered as an option exclusively to V6 variants.

In some markets such as Hong Kong and Taiwan, Toyota announced the 3.5-liter V6 model in January 2007, but was dropped from the lineup after its major facelift in 2016.

In the Philippines, the XR50 replaced the XR40 Previa in 2009. It only has the 2.4L Q variant. It is powered by Toyota's 2.4L 2AZ-FE inline-four engine with VVT-i paired to a 4-speed automatic transmission. It came with power sliding doors, automatic climate control, faux wood trim, 2DIN 6 CD audio system, speakers, remote keyless entry, leather seats among other features.

Estima Hybrid 
The third generation Estima Hybrid, only sold in Japan and Hong Kong, is powered by Toyota's 2.4-liter E-Four hybrid system with all-wheel drive. It is said to be similar to that of the Lexus RX 400h, but a generation behind.

Tarago 
The model is known as the GSR50R Tarago in Australia, and was released in March 2006. As with the previous generation, the Australian version of the model continued to use a 2.4-liter inline-four engine. In February 2007, a 3.5-liter V6 engine (torque) became available in order for the automobile to remain competitive against its main rivals in Australia.

The model had a facelift in 2009, with revisions to the headlamps and bumpers. The option of a seven-seater variant was introduced in 2008. Another update was released in 2012 with smart start as standard on all models, smart entry on GLX V6 and Ultima models, new audio systems on all models, automatic headlights and a new Rustic Brown colour option. It also received the major facelift in 2016, with updated interior and other new standard features offered, however it still bears its exterior looks mostly unchanged as with the pre-facelift design. It is available as a family van, a taxicab for regular passengers and a specially designed wheelchair accessible taxi featuring a ramp and longer wheelbase.

In May 2019, Toyota revealed the Granvia, which is heavily based on the latest HiAce van. Toyota Australia confirmed the Granvia will replace the Tarago by the end of 2019, however, they were sold alongside each other for a short period of time. As of March 2020, the Tarago has been discontinued in the Australian market and removed from the Toyota Australia website.

Facelift (2016) 
The facelifted model was launched in mid-2016, its dimensions remain mostly unchanged while it receives various new additional equipment to keep up with its competitors. In the interior features a redesigned multifunction steering wheel and a piano black center console that neatly houses a large touchscreen infotainment display. A new safety system "Toyota Safety Sense C" was offered for the first time in the facelifted Estima, but only for Japanese models. The former includes pre-collision system with pedestrian detection function, lane keep assist, high beam assist and radar cruise control.

Along with the new safety features comes with slightly redesigned headlights with LED daytime running lights, tail lights, bumpers, as well as interior with updated steering wheel design, it also becomes the first Toyota to have 360 degree 99% UV cut glass preventing 99% of UV rays from entering into the vehicle creating a cooler environment overall, this 99% UV cut glass also gets a recommendation from Skin Cancer Foundation and has a SPF 50+/PA++++ rating.

References

External links 

 Toyota Previa global site

Previa
Cars introduced in 1990
2000s cars
2010s cars
Minivans
Rear-wheel-drive vehicles
Front-wheel-drive vehicles
All-wheel-drive vehicles
Mid-engined vehicles
Vehicles with CVT transmission
Hybrid minivans
Partial zero-emissions vehicles
Euro NCAP large MPVs
Cars discontinued in 2019